Scaeosopha percnaula is a species of moth of the family Cosmopterigidae. It is found in India.

The wingspan is 17–23 mm.

References

Moths described in 1914
Scaeosophinae